Glennis Lorimer (Glennis Dorothy Browne; 27 April 1913 – 17 November 1968) was a British actress, who appeared in a number of films during the 1930s. She also appeared in the Gainsborough Pictures logo before the opening credits of films by that studio. She made her debut in the 1933 film Britannia of Billingsgate. Her last film appearance was in the 1939 Will Hay comedy Ask a Policeman. She died of cancer of the esophagus at Guy's Hospital, London.

Selected filmography
 Britannia of Billingsgate (1933)
 Orders is Orders (1934)
 My Old Dutch (1934)
 Old Faithful (1935)
 Car of Dreams (1935)
 Strictly Illegal (1935)
 It's Love Again (1936)
 All In (1936)
 The Interrupted Honeymoon (1936)
 Farewell to Cinderella (1937)
 Alf's Button Afloat (1938)
 Ask a Policeman (1939)

References

External links
 

1913 births
1968 deaths
British film actresses
20th-century British actresses